Amputees in Limbo is the second studio album by Zoogz Rift, released in 1982 by Snout.

Track listing

Personnel 
Adapted from the Amputees in Limbo liner notes.
Zoogz Rift – vocals, guitar, production, cover art, design
Musicians
Danny Buchanan – bass guitar, photography
M.B. Gordy – drums
Richie Hass – drums, vibraphone
Marc Mylar – soprano saxophone, synthesizer, engineering
Jonathan "Mako" Sharkey – keyboards, synthesizer
John Trubee – bass guitar, maracas

Release history

References

External links 
 Amputees in Limbo at iTunes
 

1982 albums
SST Records albums
Zoogz Rift albums